Titya is a genus of moths in the family Lasiocampidae. The genus was erected by Francis Walker in 1855.

Species
Titya cain Schaus
Titya cinerascens (Schaus, 1905)
Titya fraternans Schaus
Titya guthagon Schaus, 1924
Titya magnidiscata Dognin
Titya melini Bryk, 1953
Titya mexicana (Walker, 1862)
Titya noctilux Walker, 1855

External links

Lasiocampidae